John Forbes, also known in Portuguese as João Forbes (1733–1808), of Skelater, usually known as Forbes-Skelater, was a Scottish general in the Portuguese service.

Life
Forbes was the only son of Patrick Forbes of Skelater in Aberdeenshire, a branch of the Forbes of Corse.
He entered the army when a boy of fifteen as a volunteer at the siege of Maestricht, and was successful in winning a commission. He was essentially a soldier of fortune, and when Portugal applied to Britain for officers to reorganise her army under the Count of Lippe Buckeburg, he was one of the first to volunteer. He took part in the defense of Portugal during the failed Franco-Spanish invasions of Portugal in 1762.

Forbes remained in Portugal after the termination of the Seven Years' War; as a Roman Catholic who had married a Portuguese lady, he had no difficulty in getting employment. He acted for many years as adjutant-general of the Portuguese army, but at last, in 1789, he was asked to resign, the object of some jealousy of the Portuguese officers, and was made a knight of the order of Aviz, and promoted to the rank of general.

When Portugal decided to join the French Revolutionary Wars, a corps was sent to assist the Spanish army in the War of the Pyrenees, under the command of Forbes, who replaced the Marques de Minas, his old commander in the 1762 campaigns, when the latter fell ill. The Portuguese soldiers behaved well, but the commanders of the Spanish army were always at variance, and Forbes himself had much trouble with his adjutant-general, Gomes Freire de Andrade. The French republicans defeated the combined Spanish-Portuguese army, and Forbes returned to Portugal with his corps. His reports on the expeditiondespatches to the Portuguese government. He was too old to seek further active service, so he went to Brazil with Queen Mary I, the prince regent, and the court when they fled from the forces led by Jean-Andoche Junot, and on arrival there he was appointed governor of Rio de Janeiro. He died there on 8 April 1808.

References

Recipients of the Order of Aviz
18th-century Scottish people
18th-century Portuguese people
19th-century Scottish people
19th-century Portuguese people
Scottish Roman Catholics
18th-century Roman Catholics
19th-century Roman Catholics
Scottish soldiers
British mercenaries
1733 births
1808 deaths
People from Aberdeenshire
Scottish expatriates in Portugal
Portuguese people of Scottish descent
18th-century Portuguese military personnel
19th-century Portuguese military personnel
British expatriates in Brazil